The Statute Law Revision Act 1898 (61 & 62 Vict c 22) is an Act of the Parliament of the United Kingdom.

This Act was repealed for the United Kingdom by Group 1 of Part IX of Schedule 1 to the Statute Law (Repeals) Act 1998.

The enactments which were repealed (whether for the whole or any part of the United Kingdom) by this Act were repealed so far as they extended to the Isle of Man on 25 July 1991.

This Act was retained for the Republic of Ireland by section 2(2)(a) of, and Part 4 of Schedule 1 to, the Statute Law Revision Act 2007.

Section 2 - Application of repealed enactments in local courts
This section was repealed by section 32(4) of, and Part V of Schedule 5 to, the Administration of Justice Act 1977.

Section 3 - Substituted repeals
This section provided that the second part of the Schedule to this Act was to be substituted for so much of the Statute Law Revision Act 1893 as related to the Record of Title Act (Ireland) 1865, and that the Statute Law Revision Act 1893 was to be read and construed as if the part so substituted had originally been enacted therein.

This section was repealed by section 1 of, and the Schedule to, the Statute Law Revision Act 1908.

Schedule
The Schedule was by section 1 of, and the Schedule to, the Statute Law Revision Act 1908.

See also
Statute Law Revision Act

References
Halsbury's Statutes,
The Public General Acts passed in the sixty-first and sixty-second years of the reign of Her Majesty Queen Victoria. HMSO. London. 1898. Pages 45 to 95.

External links
List of amendments and repeals in the Republic of Ireland from the Irish Statute Book

United Kingdom Acts of Parliament 1898